Colm Gallagher (died 26 June 1957) was an Irish Fianna Fáil politician who was elected twice as Teachta Dála (TD) for Dublin North-Central, in 1951 and in 1957.

His first candidacy was at the 1948 general election, where he was unsuccessful, winning just 3.3% of the first-preference votes and losing his deposit. At the 1951 general election, he tripled his share of the vote and won a second seat for Fianna Fáil in the three-seat constituency.

He lost his seat at the 1954 general election to the Labour Party's Maureen O'Carroll, but defeated her at the 1957 general election.

His death in June 1957, just three months after the general election, triggered a by-election on 14 November, which was won by an independent candidate, Frank Sherwin.

Colm Gallagher lived in Glasnevin. He was married to Peggy Gallagher and they had three sons and one daughter.

References

Year of birth missing
1957 deaths
Fianna Fáil TDs
Members of the 14th Dáil
Members of the 16th Dáil
Politicians from Dublin (city)